is a passenger railway station in located in the town of Kumatori, Osaka Prefecture, Japan, operated by West Japan Railway Company (JR West).

Lines

Station layout
The station consists of two island platforms connected by an elevated station building. The station is staffed.

Platforms

Adjacent stations

|-
!colspan=5|JR West

History
Kumatori Station opened on 16 June 1930. With the privatization of the Japan National Railways (JNR) on 1 April 1987, the station came under the aegis of the West Japan Railway Company.

Station numbering was introduced in March 2018 with Kumatori being assigned station number JR-R44.

Passenger statistics
In fiscal 2019, the station was used by an average of 10,978 passengers daily (boarding passengers only).

Surrounding area
 Izumisano City Sanodai Elementary School
 Osaka University of Health and Sport Sciences
 Osaka University of Tourism
 Kansai Medical University

See also
List of railway stations in Japan

References

External links

 Kumatori Station Official Site

Railway stations in Osaka Prefecture
Railway stations in Japan opened in 1930
Kumatori, Osaka